Dorothy Graham may refer to:

Dorothy Graham, character in Bad Blood (TV series)
Dorothy Graham, character in Know Thy Child
Dorothy Graham, character in Tom (TV series) 
Dorothy Graham, character in The Way of a Maid